George Kahumoku Jr. is a Grammy Award winning Hawaiian musician specializing in slack-key guitar.

Born in Kona on the Big Island of Hawaiʻi, he was labeled as "Hawaii's Renaissance Man" by Nona Beamer because of his far reaching talents: farmer, author, musician and composer, sculptor and artist, and Hawaiian cultural practitioner, particularly as it relates to the land or 'aina.Maui Time Weekly. He received the 2007 Grammy Award for Best Hawaiian Music Album for the compilation album Legends Of Hawaiian Slack Key Guitar – Live From Maui and subsequently 2 more for Treasures of Hawaiian Slack Key Guitar and Masters of Hawaiian Slack Key Guitar, vol.2.  All of these compilation albums were recorded live at his Slack Key Show - Masters of Hawaiian Music show which opened in 2003 and is still operating after 19 years.  It is the longest running weekly concert series in Hawaii featuring the best in slack key guitar as well as ukulele, steel, and falsetto.

References

External links
Official website
Autobiography
Profile in Santa Cruz Sentinel

Native Hawaiian musicians
Living people
Year of birth missing (living people)
Guitarists from Hawaii
American male guitarists